Wilhelm His is the name of:

Wilhelm His, Sr. (1831–1904), Swiss anatomist
Wilhelm His, Jr. (1863–1934), Swiss cardiologist, son of Wilhelm His, Sr.